The Southern Xinjiang railway or Nanjiang railway, is a railway between Turpan and Kashgar in Xinjiang, China.

The line joins the Lanzhou–Xinjiang railway at Turpan (connecting to Ürümqi) and the Kashgar–Hotan railway in Kashgar.

History
The Southern Xinjiang railway was built from east to west.  The Turpan-Korla section in the east (457 km) was built from 1974 to 1984.  The western section from Korla to Kashgar was built from 1996 to 1999.  From Yanqi to Kashgar, the line follows National Highway 314.  The Kashgar–Hotan railway, originally referred to as Phase III of the Southern Xinjiang railway, opened in 2010.  From 2008 to 2013, the Korla to Kuqa section,  in length, was double-tracked.

In December 2014, a second double-track electrified line between Turpan and Korla opened to commercial operation.

On 1 January 2021, a branch from south of Kalpin to Tumxuk was opened to passenger service.

Station list

Rail connections
 Turpan: Lanzhou–Xinjiang railway
 Kashgar: Kashgar–Hotan railway

Gallery

See also

 List of railways in China

References

Railway lines in China
Rail transport in Xinjiang